Rasem Jamal Badran Arabic: راسم بدران (born 1945 in Palestine), a Jordanian architect from a Palestinian descent whose works are based on a methodological approach in defining Architecture as a continuous dialogue between contemporary needs and historical inherited cultural values.

Education
Rasem Badran received his early education in Ramallah. In 1970 Badran graduated with a degree in architecture from Technische Universität Darmstadt (Darmstadt University of Technology) in former West Germany.

Positions and roles
 Co-founder of Dar Al Omran planning Architecture engineering company (1979) 
 Badran is a permanent member in the Academic Council for the international Academy of Architecture (I.A.A) in Sophia
 Member of the Greater Amman Municipality (2007)
 Design advisory board member in Moutamarat – International Design Initiative (2007)
 Member of the Dubai Municipality "Dubai International Awards for Best Practices" (2006)
 Member of the International Jury of the ARCASIA Award for Architecture which was held in Dhaka – Bangladesh (2003)
 Member of the International Master Jury of the Aga Khan Award for Architecture (1998)
 Member of the International Jury of the Governor-General's award for architecture, Kingston, Jamaica (1992)
 Member of the Master Jury committee for the Arab Towns Organization prizes (1985)
 Member of International Jury for planning and urban development in the old area of "Bab-Al Sheikh" in Baghdad - Iraq (1981)

Selected projects

Justice Palace in Riyadh
Great Mosque of Riyadh and the Old City Center Redevelopment
Movenpick Petra Hotel
King Abdul Aziz Historical Centre
King Abdul Aziz Foundation for Research and Archives
Saudi Ministry of Culture
Abu Dhabi Courts Complex
Al Bujairi quarter

Awards and honours
 In 2022 he gained the Saudi Nationality as an honoring for his achievements in the architecture in Saudi Arabia
 Honorary Ph.D. in Architectural Design from the Jordan University of Science and Technology for his advancement in Architectural Theory and Practice
 Palestine Award for Architecture
 First Arab Architect Award which was announced by the Arab Housing Ministers of the Arab League in Cairo - Egypt (1997)
 The Aga Khan Award for Architecture, received for the design of the Grand Mosque of Riyadh and redevelopment of Riyadh Old City Center (1995)
 Arab Architecture Award received in Morocco at the general conference of the Arab Towns Organization (1990)
 Winner of the Museum of Islamic Art international competition in Doha-Qatar which was sponsored by Aga Khan - Geneva Office in cooperation with the government of Qatar
 Winner of Sidon Seafront development Competition in Lebanon
 Won the first prize (Elementa 72) in the international competition for the design of limited income housing sponsored by the Ministry of Housing in Bonn, West Germany
 "Al Hussein Medal for Distinguished Performance of the First Order" For his great distinguished efforts in the enrichment of modern Islamic architecture
 "TAMAYOUZ LIFETIME ACHIEVEMENT AWARD FOR ARCHITECTURE" The Lifetime Achievement Award celebrates the achievements of individuals who have made significant contributions toward humanity and the advancement of architecture and the built environment in the Near East and North Africa. The award also recognizes those whose commitments to architecture were and continue to be unparalleled. The award was established as part of the Tamayouz Excellence Award program, which champions and celebrates the best architecture worldwide.

Publications
 "The Architecture of Rasem Badran: Narratives on People and Place", James Steele (Author), Thames & Hudson (Publisher), 2005
啊啊

References

The Architecture of Rasem Badra Times & Hudson 2005
World Architecture Community

External links
 company website

1945 births
Modernist architects
Living people
People from Amman
Technische Universität Darmstadt alumni
Palestinian architects
Jordanian architects